The Salto Grande Dam is a large hydroelectric dam on the Uruguay River, located between Concordia, Argentina, and Salto, Uruguay; thus shared between the two countries.

The construction of the dam began in 1974 and was completed in 1979.

Gallery

See also 

 List of conventional hydroelectric power stations
 List of power stations in Argentina
 Salto Grande Waterfall
 Salto Grande Bridge

References 

Dams completed in 1979
Energy infrastructure completed in 1979
Dams in Uruguay
Dams in Argentina
Buildings and structures in Salto Department
Hydroelectric power stations in Uruguay
Hydroelectric power stations in Argentina
Uruguay River
Geography of Entre Ríos Province
Argentina–Uruguay border